The Shanghai University of Science and Technology (SUST) was a public university in Shanghai, China. 

The Shanghai University of Technology, the Shanghai University of Science and Technology, Shanghai University, and the Shanghai Institute of Science and Technology merged to establish the current Shanghai University in May 1994.

History

Shanghai University was rebuilt in 1994, by consolidating Shanghai University of Technology, Shanghai University of Science & Technology, Shanghai Institute of Science & Technology and the former Shanghai University.

Shanghai University of Science & Technology was formed by East China Branch of Chinese Academy of Sciences in 1958, with close relationship with the academies and institutes.

Location

Shanghai University of Science & Technology site now is Shanghai University, Jiading Campus.

20 Chengzhong Lu, Jiading District, Shanghai 201800, China

上海市嘉定区城中路20号

President
Prof. Guo Benyu

External links

Official Websites
SHU Official Website in Chinese
SHU Official Website in English

Other Websites
 上海大学 SHU in Chinese Wikipedia

Defunct universities and colleges in Shanghai
Educational institutions established in 1958
1958 establishments in China
1994 disestablishments in China
Technical universities and colleges in China